Harmony Express is a 4-part a cappella chorus for both women and men based in Germantown, Maryland. The non-profit chorus is under the direction of Frank Kirschner as of 2017. It is the performing arm of the Germantown Chapter of the Barbershop Harmony Society. The chorus was featured in the documentary Barbershop Singing Old and New.

History
On July 1, 2008, Mike Edison filed the Maryland Articles of Incorporation as president of the newly formed music group. That same year the Germantown, Maryland Chapter of the Barbershop Harmony Society was chartered by Edison and sponsored by the Montgomery County, MD Chapter (the Hometowne USA Chorus).

Harmony Express claimed their first Barbershop Harmony Society award in 2010 by becoming the AA plateau champion in their division. In 2011, they moved up to the AAA plateau and became the second place champion in the division. That same year they were also awarded "Most Improved Chorus" in the Southern Division.

Performances
Harmony Express has performed at the F. Scott Fitzgerald Theatre, Montgomery County Agricultural Fair, Kentlands' Oktoberfest, Glenview Mansion, Celebrate Gaithersburg, Lakeforest Mall, Rio/Washingtonian Center, St. Rose of Lima Fiesta, and Leisure World. They have also been invited to host an a cappella showcase by the City of Gaithersburg. The chorus competes regularly, puts on an annual show, and serenades lovers on Valentine's Day.

Quartets
Chapter quartets include The Glen Echoes and Handsome Reward. The Glen Echoes has performed The Star Spangled Banner eight times at Camden Yards for the Baltimore Orioles, including a July 2007 performance before a crowd of 40,000 people and a nationwide TV audience.

Awards and recognition

 Invited three times to compete in the District contest (2010, 2011, 2012)
 2010 Southern Division Plateau AA Champion
 2011 Southern Division Most Improved Chorus
 2011 Second Place Champion (Southern Division)

See also
A cappella music
Choral music of Washington, D.C.
List of Maryland music groups
Barbershop music
Barbershop Harmony Society

External links
Official website
Chapter Entry in Mid-Atlantic District of the Barbershop Harmony Society

References

A cappella musical groups
American choirs
American vocal groups
Barbershop Harmony Society choruses
Musical groups established in 2008
2008 establishments in Maryland